Jacek Fafiński (born 21 October 1970 in Lubawa) is a Polish wrestler. Fafiński won the silver medal at the 1996 Summer Olympics in Atlanta in the 90 kg Greco-Roman division. Fafinski went 3–0 in the 90 kg Greco-Roman division, defeating Abdelaziz Essafoui of Morocco, Rozy Redzhepov of Turkmenistan, and Iordanis Konstantinidis of Greece before losing to Vyacheslav Oleynyk of Ukraine in the gold medal match.

For his sport achievements, he received: 
 Golden Cross of Merit in 1996.

References
Jacek Fafiński - Biography and Olympic Results 

1970 births
Living people
Wrestlers at the 1996 Summer Olympics
Polish male sport wrestlers
Olympic wrestlers of Poland
Olympic silver medalists for Poland
Olympic medalists in wrestling
People from Lubawa
Sportspeople from Warmian-Masurian Voivodeship
Medalists at the 1996 Summer Olympics
20th-century Polish people
21st-century Polish people